To Sir, with Love is a 1967 British drama film that deals with social and racial issues in an inner city school. It stars Sidney Poitier and features Christian Roberts, Judy Geeson, Suzy Kendall and singer Lulu making her film debut. James Clavell directed from his own screenplay, which was based on E. R. Braithwaite's 1959 autobiographical novel of the same name.

The film's title song "To Sir with Love", sung by Lulu, peaked at the top of the Billboard Hot 100 chart in the United States for five weeks in the autumn of 1967 and ultimately was the best-selling single in the United States of that year. The movie ranked number 27 on Entertainment Weeklys list of the 50 Best High School Movies.

A made-for-television sequel, To Sir, with Love II (1996), was released nearly three decades later, with Poitier reprising his starring role.

Plot 
In the mid-1960s, Mark Thackeray, an immigrant to Britain from British Guiana, has been unable to obtain an engineering position despite an 18-month job search. He accepts a teaching post for Class 12 at North Quay Secondary School in the tough East End of London, as an interim position, despite having no experience.

The pupils there have been rejected from other schools, and Thackeray is a replacement for the deceased former teacher. The pupils, led by Bert Denham and Pamela Dare (who later develops a strong crush on Thackeray), behave badly: their antics range from vandalism to distasteful pranks. Thackeray retains a calm demeanour, but loses his temper when he discovers something being burned in the classroom stove, which turns out to be a girl's sanitary towel. He orders the boys out of the classroom, then reprimands all the girls, either for being responsible or passively observing, for what he says is their "slutty behaviour". Thackeray is angry with himself for allowing his pupils to incense him. Changing his approach, he informs the class that they will no longer study from textbooks. Until the end of term, he will treat them as adults and expects them to behave as such. He declares that they will address him as 'Sir' or 'Mr. Thackeray'; the girls will be addressed as 'Miss' and boys by their surnames. They are also allowed to discuss any issue they wish. He gradually wins over the class, except for Denham who continually baits him.

Thackeray arranges a class outing to the Victoria and Albert Museum and the Natural History Museum in South Kensington which goes well. The trip is represented by a series of still photographs as Lulu sings "To Sir with Love".

He loses some support when he defuses a potentially violent situation between his student Potter and the gym teacher, Mr. Bell. He demands that Potter apologise directly to Bell, even if he believes Bell was wrong. The group later refuses to invite Thackeray to the class dance. When mixed-race student Seales' white English mother dies, the class takes up a collection for a wreath but refuse to accept Thackeray's donation. The students decline to deliver the wreath in person to Seales' house, fearing neighbourhood gossip for visiting a "coloured" person's house.

The headmaster tells Thackeray that the "adult approach" has failed, and future outings are cancelled. Thackeray is to take over the boys' gym classes until the headmaster can find a replacement. Meanwhile, Thackeray receives an engineering job offer in the post.

Pamela Dare's mother asks for Thackeray to talk to her daughter about her behaviour at home, but this annoys Pamela, whom Thackeray believes is infatuated with him. During a gym class, Denham smugly challenges Thackeray to a boxing match. Denham delivers several blows to Thackeray's face but the bout comes to an abrupt end when Thackeray delivers one punch to Denham's solar plexus. Thackeray compliments Denham's ability and suggests he teach boxing to the younger pupils next year. Denham, finally impressed by Thackeray, expresses his admiration for Thackeray to his classmates. Thackeray regains their respect and is invited to the class dance. Later, when Thackeray attends the funeral of Seales' mother, he is touched to find that his lectures on personal choice and responsibility have had an effect and the entire class has attended.

At the dance, Pamela persuades Thackeray to be her partner for the "Ladies Choice" dance. Afterward, the class presents to Thackeray "a little present to remember us by". Too moved to speak, Thackeray retires to his classroom.

A rowdy couple abruptly enters the classroom. They mock Thackeray's gift, a silver tankard and card inscribed "To Sir, with love" signed by the entire departing class, and goad Thackeray that they will be in his class next year. After they leave, Thackeray stands up and tears up the engineering job offer, reconciled to the work he has ahead of him. He then takes a flower from the vase on his desk, places it in his lapel, and leaves.

Cast

Production
Sidney Poitier and James Clavell wanted to do the film, but Columbia was reluctant. They agreed to make the film for small fees, provided Poitier got 10% of the gross and Clavell 30% of the profits. "When we were ready to shoot, Columbia wanted either a rape or a big fight put in," said Martin Baum. "We held out, saying this was a gentle story, and we won."

The film was shot in Wapping (including the Wapping railway station) and Shadwell in the East End of London, in the Victoria and Albert Museum and at Pinewood Studios.

Reception 
Upon its U.S. release, Bosley Crowther began his review by contrasting the film with Poitier's role and performance in the 1955 film Blackboard Jungle; unlike that earlier film, Crowther says "a nice air of gentility suffuses this pretty color film, and Mr. Poitier gives a quaint example of being proper and turning the other cheek. Although he controls himself with difficulty in some of his confrontations with his class, and even flares up on one occasion, he never acts like a boor, the way one of his fellow teachers (played by Geoffrey Bayldon) does. Except for a few barbed comments by the latter, there is little intrusion of or discussion about the issue of race: It is as discreetly played down as are many other probable tensions in this school. To Sir, with Love comes off as a cozy, good-humored and unbelievable little tale."

Halliwell's Film and Video Guide describes it as "sentimental non-realism" and quotes a Monthly Film Bulletin review (possibly contemporary with its British release), which claims that "the sententious script sounds as if it has been written by a zealous Sunday school teacher after a particularly exhilarating boycott of South African oranges".

The Time Out Film Guide says that it "bears no resemblance to school life as we know it" and the "hoodlums' miraculous reformation a week before the end of term (thanks to teacher Poitier) is laughable". Although agreeing with the claims about the film's sentimentality, and giving it a mediocre rating, the Virgin Film Guide asserts: "What makes [this] such an enjoyable film is the mythic nature of Poitier's character. He manages to come across as a real person, while simultaneously embodying everything there is to know about morality, respect and integrity."

The film premiered and became a hit one month before another film about troubled schools, Up the Down Staircase, appeared.

The novel's author E.R. Braithwaite loathed the film, although it provided him with some financial security, particularly because of its omission of the novel's interracial relationship.

To Sir, with Love holds an 89% "Fresh" rating on the review aggregate website Rotten Tomatoes based on 28 reviews. The film grossed $42,432,803 at the box office in the United States, yielding $19,100,000 in rentals, on a $640,000 budget, making it the sixth highest grossing picture of 1967 in the US. Poitier especially benefited from that film's success considering he agreed on a mere $30,000 fee in exchange for 10% of the gross box office and thus arranged one of the most impressive payoffs in film history. In fact, although Columbia insisted on an annual cap to Poitier of $25,000 to fulfill that percentage term, the studio was forced to revise the deal with Poitier when they calculated they would be committed to 80 years of those payments.

Despite the character of Mark Thackeray being a leading role, the film has been criticised in modern times for Portier's portrayal of the Magical Negro trope. Specific criticism of the portrayal was directed at the character's service as the sounding board and voice of reason for white antagonists.

Soundtrack 

The soundtrack album features music by Lulu, The Mindbenders, and incidental music by Ron Grainer. The original album was released on Fontana Records. It was re-released onto CD in 1995. AllMusic rated it three stars out of five.

The title song was a Cash Box Top 100 number-one single for three weeks.

 "To Sir With Love" (lyrics: Don Black; music: Mark London) – Lulu
 School Break Dancing "Stealing My Love from Me" (lyrics & music: Mark London) – Lulu
 Thackeray meets Faculty, Then Alone
 Music from Lunch Break "Off and Running" (lyric: Toni Wine; music: Carole Bayer) – The Mindbenders
 Thackeray Loses Temper, Gets an Idea
 Museum Outings Montage "To Sir, with Love" - Lulu
 A Classical Lesson
 Perhaps I Could Tidy Your Desk
 Potter's loss of temper in gym
 Thackeray reads letter about job
 Thackeray and Denham box in gym
 The funeral
 End of Term Dance "It's Getting Harder all the Time" (lyrics: Ben Raleigh; music: Charles Abertine) – The Mindbenders
 To Sir With Love – Lulu

James Clavell and Lulu's manager Marion Massey were angered and disappointed when the title song was not included in the nominations for the Academy Award for Best Original Song at the 40th Academy Awards in 1968. Clavell and Massey raised a formal objection to the exclusion, but to no avail.

Awards and honours

Other honours 
The film is recognised by American Film Institute in these lists:
 2004: AFI's 100 Years...100 Songs:
 "To Sir With Love" – Nominated

See also 

 The Hindi film Imtihan (1974) starring Vinod Khanna as the teacher, and Tanuja as his love interest, was inspired by the film
 The Egyptian comedy Madrast Al-Mushaghebeen was inspired by the film.
 Up the Down Staircase, also released in 1967
 List of teachers portrayed in films

References

External links 
 
 
 
 Christian Roberts and Judy Geeson discuss making To Sir, with Love on its 50th anniversary, The Spectrum, Accessed June 7, 2017.

1967 films
1960s coming-of-age drama films
1960s high school films
British coming-of-age drama films
British high school films
British teen drama films
Columbia Pictures films
Biographical films about educators
Films about teacher–student relationships
Cultural depictions of British men
Films about race and ethnicity
Films based on British novels
Films directed by James Clavell
Films set in London
Films shot at Pinewood Studios
Films shot in London
Films with screenplays by James Clavell
Films scored by Ron Grainer
1967 drama films
1960s English-language films
1960s British films